Triplophysa turpanensis is a species of stone loach in the genus Triplophysa. It is endemic to Xinjiang in extreme western China. It grows to  SL.

References

T
Endemic fauna of China
Freshwater fish of China
Fish described in 1992